Jordan Hospital is a medical center in Amman, Jordan, established in 1993 under royal patronage. A 300-bed multispecialty equipped facility, it is one of the leaders in healthcare in the country, and is a main referral center in the Middle East.

References

Hospital buildings completed in 1993
Hospitals in Amman
Hospitals established in 1993
1993 establishments in Jordan